William Paine Lord (July 20, 1838February 17, 1911) was an American Republican politician who served as the 9th governor of Oregon from 1895 to 1899. The Delaware native previously served as the 27th justice of the Oregon Supreme Court, including three times as the chief justice of that court. After serving as governor he was appointed as an ambassador to Argentina in South America and later helped to codify Oregon's laws.

Early life
Born to Edward and Elizabeth (Paine) Lord on July 20, 1838 in Dover, Delaware, Lord was partially deaf, and had limited speaking ability. He received his primary education at a Quaker school and through private tutoring. He subsequently studied law at Fairfield College, graduating in 1860. Before he could continue further into his studies, Lord volunteered for military service in the American Civil War, advancing to the rank of Major in the 1st Delaware Cavalry in the Union Army of the Potomac.

Once the war ended, Lord continued in law school at Albany College in New York, graduating there in 1866. He then returned to the military for a second time, re-enlisting at the rank of lieutenant. His duties would include postings at Alcatraz in San Francisco and Fort Steilacoom near Tacoma, Washington. When the United States took formal possession of Alaska in 1867, Lt. Lord was sent to Sitka. In 1868, Lord resigned from the army in order to set up a law practice in Salem, Oregon.

Entry into politics
William Paine Lord soon became involved in politics, as he became Salem's City Attorney in 1870.  His first elected office was a state Senate seat in 1878. He resigned his Senate seat for a successful run as the Republican nominee for Justice of the Oregon Supreme Court.  Lord served on the court from 1880 until 1894. He was a popular justice and had a reputation of being the most competent jurist in state history, serving out his last term as Chief Justice.

He accepted the Republican nomination for the 1894 Oregon governor's race, stepping down from the court after his gubernatorial election victory.

Governorship
William Lord was popular and he was easily elected to the Governor's Office.  He immediately set out to support higher education, eliminate corruption from land speculators, and fueled support for the direct election of United States Senators, when the Senate refused to seat Henry W. Corbett, Lord's appointee. In 1895, the University of Oregon conferred an honorary doctorate of laws degree on the governor.

He promoted ending the corrupt land speculation practices of the time by creating the State Land Board, headed by an official State Land Agent.  The present land-use system protecting Oregon's wildlife and fisheries would evolve from this early agency.

The 1897 House failed to organize, caught up on a dispute over the reelection of U.S. Senator John H. Mitchell.

Lord also called for a constitutional amendment to the Oregon Constitution allowing the Governor a line item veto.  While nothing came of this during his term of office, later governors would support Lord's proposal.  The line item veto was finally approved in 1916.

Lord lost his bid for a second term, in the closely fought 1898 primary election campaign against fellow Republican Theodore T. Geer.

Later life
Shortly after leaving the Governor's Office, Lord was appointed the U.S. Minister (Ambassador) to Argentina by the McKinley Administration. He served in that capacity until 1902, after which he returned to Oregon.

In 1902, William Paine Lord was appointed as Code Commissioner by the Supreme Court of Oregon. In this position, which he held until 1910, he examined and annotated all existing Oregon Statute Laws, compiling them into three volumex, Lord's Oregon Lawsofficially the Oregon Statute Code of 1909.

In 1910 Lord retired to San Francisco, where he would die on February 17, 1911. His body was returned to Oregon where it is interred in Mount Crest Abbey Mausoleum in Salem.

References

External links

 Oregon State Library
 Oregon State Archive bio
 Klooster, Karl. Round the Roses II: More Past Portland Perspectives, p. 111, 1992 
Oregon Governor William Lord from Oregon Magazine
Findagrave memorial
 Oregon State Archives: Lord Administration-Photo, bio, records, and some public speeches of Governor Lord

1838 births
1911 deaths
Republican Party governors of Oregon
Republican Party Oregon state senators
Albany Law School alumni
People of Oregon in the American Civil War
Politicians from Salem, Oregon
Chief Justices of the Oregon Supreme Court
Ambassadors of the United States to Argentina
Union Army officers
People from Dover, Delaware
Burials at City View Cemetery
Lawyers from Salem, Oregon
Oregon city attorneys
19th-century American judges
19th-century American lawyers
20th-century American diplomats
Justices of the Oregon Supreme Court